Daniel Roger Robertson (born September 30, 1985) is an American former professional baseball outfielder. He played in Major League Baseball (MLB) for the Texas Rangers, Los Angeles Angels of Anaheim, Seattle Mariners, and Cleveland Indians. Robertson currently serves as bench coach of the Akron RubberDucks, the Double-A affiliate of the Cleveland Guardians.

Playing career

San Diego Padres
Robertson was drafted by the San Diego Padres in the 33rd round of the 2008 Major League Baseball Draft out of Oregon State University.

Texas Rangers
On April 23, 2014, Robertson was acquired by the Texas Rangers through a trade with the Padres, and called up to the majors the same day.

Los Angeles Angels
Robertson was traded to the Los Angeles Angels of Anaheim for a player to be named later on November 20, 2014.

Seattle Mariners
Robertson was claimed off waivers by the Seattle Mariners on November 6, 2015, and designated for assignment by them on December 18.

Cleveland Indians
On November 23, 2016, Robertson signed a minor league contract with the Cleveland Indians that included an invitation to spring training. After beginning the 2017 season with the Triple-A Columbus Clippers, Robertson's contract was purchased by the Indians on May 14. He was designated for assignment on August 10, 2017, to make room for Jay Bruce on the 40-man roster  and was released the same day after clearing waivers. The Indians re-signed Robertson to a minor league contract on August 15, 2017. He was released on August 28, 2017.

Arizona Diamondbacks
Robertson signed a minor league contract with the Arizona Diamondbacks on February 14, 2018. He was released by the organization on August 3, 2018.

Sugar Land Skeeters
On August 14, 2018, Robertson signed with the Sugar Land Skeeters of the Atlantic League of Professional Baseball. He became a free agent following the 2018 season.

Kansas City T-Bones
On February 15, 2019, Robertson signed with the Kansas City T-Bones of the American Association. He was released on June 1, 2019.

Cleburne Railroaders
On June 17, 2019, Robertson signed with the Cleburne Railroaders of the American Association of Independent Professional Baseball. Robertson was released on March 6, 2020. In the off-season, Robertson had accepted a coaching post at his alma mater, Oregon State University.

Coaching career
On January 13, 2022, the Cleveland Guardians announced Robertson had been hired as bench coach of the Lynchburg Hillcats, the Guardians' Single-A affiliate, for the 2022 season. Robertson was promoted to bench coach of the Double-A Akron RubberDucks on February 7, 2023.

References

External links

Oregon State Beavers bio

1985 births
Living people
People from Fontana, California
Baseball players from California
Major League Baseball outfielders
Texas Rangers players
Los Angeles Angels players
Seattle Mariners players
Cleveland Indians players
Oregon State Beavers baseball players
Eugene Emeralds players
Fort Wayne TinCaps players
Lake Elsinore Storm players
San Antonio Missions players
Tucson Padres players
Estrellas Orientales players
American expatriate baseball players in the Dominican Republic
Yaquis de Obregón players
American expatriate baseball players in Mexico
El Paso Chihuahuas players
Round Rock Express players
Salt Lake Bees players
Arizona League Angels players
Tacoma Rainiers players
Columbus Clippers players
Sugar Land Skeeters players
Charros de Jalisco players
Kansas City T-Bones players
Cleburne Railroaders players